This is a list of television programs currently and formerly broadcast by Nickelodeon Sonic.The channel was launched on 20 December 2011.

Current programming

Animated series 
 Gattu Battu
 Munki And Trunk
 Pakdam Pakdai
 Pinaki And Happy The Bhoot Bandhus
 Ninja Hattori

Live-action  
 Power Rangers
 Power Rangers Beast Morphers
 Power Rangers Samurai

Former programming

Animated series 
 Avatar: The Last Airbender
 The Daltons
 Dennis the Menace and Gnasher
 Ejen Ali
 Extreme Football
 Galactik Football
 Gattu Battu
 Golmaal Jr.
 Hubert and Takako
 Jackie Chan's Fantasia
 Keymon Ache 
 Kong: The Animated Series
 Kung Fu Cats
 Kung Fu Panda: Legends of Awesomeness
 Oggy and the Cockroaches
 Rimba Racer
 Rocket Monkeys
 Shaktimaan: The Animated Series
 Shaun the Sheep
 Supa Strikas
 Suraj: The Rising Star 
 Teenage Mutant Ninja Turtles
 The Smurfs
 Zig and Sharko
 Blackie The Funny Dog
 Dinobob
 Dinosaur King
 Ghosts At School
 Hyperdimension Neptunia: The Animation
 Idaten Jump
 Kickers
 Mighty Cat Masked Niyander
 Monsuno
 Ninja Hattori
 Perman
 Rock Lee & His Ninja Pals
 Zatchbell

Live-action 
 Are You Afraid of the Dark?
 The Adrenaline Project
 House of Anubis
 Ninja Turtles: The Next Mutation
 Power Rangers
 Supah Ninjas
 Ultraman Mebius

References

Lists of television series by network